Wilmington International Airport  is a public airport located just north of Wilmington, North Carolina, in unincorporated Wrightsboro, Cape Fear Township, New Hanover County. ILM covers 1,800 acres (728 ha).

During the calendar year 2018 ILM had a record high number of passengers with 470,255 enplanements and 463,803 deplanements, totaling 934,058 passengers. The airport has two runways and a single terminal which has eight gates. The airport is also home to a fixed-base operation (FBO). There is a 24-hour US Customs and Border Protection ramp for international flights wishing to stop at the airport. The separate terminal was built to serve the international flights that land each year (private or charter).  The airport's location on the coast, halfway between NYC and Miami, makes it a desirable and less busy entry point to the United States, with the recent addition of a 24-hour US Customs ramp, which was completed in 2008.

Wilmington International Airport is owned by New Hanover County, North Carolina which leases the airport to the Wilmington Airport Authority. The current Airport Director is Julie Wilsey, AAE. The New Hanover County Airport Authority has seven board members, appointed by the New Hanover County Commissioners.

History
The airport was named Bluethenthal Field on Memorial Day, May 30, 1928, in honor of Arthur Bluethenthal, a former All-American football player and decorated World War I pilot who was the first North Carolinian to die in the war.

During World War II, the airfield was used by the United States Army Air Forces Third Air Force for anti submarine patrols and training using P-47 Thunderbolt aircraft. The Army expanded the airfield with three new 7,000-foot runways, and after the war, deeded the site back to New Hanover County at no cost.

In the 1950s it became known as the New Hanover County Airport. In 1988 the airport added "International" to become known as New Hanover County International Airport. On December 17, 1997, the New Hanover County Airport Authority changed the name to Wilmington International Airport.

Piedmont Airlines began commercial flights to Wilmington in February 1948, and used Wilmington as one of its initial crew bases. Its first route was between Wilmington and Cincinnati, Ohio, with stops in Pinehurst, Charlotte, Asheville, the Tri-Cities and Lexington. Piedmont was the airport's only scheduled carrier as of 1975, with flights to Atlanta, Fayetteville, Jacksonville, Kinston, Myrtle Beach, New Bern, Norfolk and Washington-National, using YS-11, FH-227 and Boeing 737 aircraft. Piedmont was acquired by USAir in 1989; USAir was renamed US Airways in 1997, and merged with American Airlines in 2013.

In addition to flights to its main regional hub at Charlotte Douglas International Airport, US Airways introduced three daily flights between Wilmington and La Guardia Airport in New York City during the 2000s following lobbying from the Wilmington community. US Airways also introduced nonstop service to Ronald Reagan Washington National Airport in March 2011. American Eagle began service between Wilmington and Chicago O'Hare International Airport in July 2011 after the airport authority offered two years of waived fees and marketing cost sharing. This route had been actively sought by the local business community for its connections to the West Coast and to Asia. The route was discontinued on April 2, 2012, but reinstated in early 2018.

ILM was one of four airports along the East Coast which served as an emergency abort landing site for the Space Shuttle. Improvements in the orbiter's braking system reduced the previous  runway requirement to  enabling ILM's 8,016-foot (2,443 m) runway to serve the role. ILM has also been used for touch-and-go training flights by United States Air Force VIP aircraft, including the Boeing VC-25 (Air Force One), C-32 and C-40.

Superfund site
A  burn pit on the airport property was named a Superfund site on March 31, 1989. The burn pit was built in 1968 and was used until 1979 for firefighter training missions. Jet fuel, gasoline, petroleum storage tank bottoms, fuel oil, kerosene, and sorbent materials from oil spill cleanups were burned in the pit. Up to 500 gallons of fuel and other chemicals were used during each firefighting training exercise. The firefighters in the training missions mainly used water to put out the fires, but carbon dioxide and other dry chemicals were also used. The soil and groundwater was found to have multiple contaminants, including benzene, ethylbenzene, total xylene, 2-methylnaphthalene, phenanthrene, chloroform, 1,2-dichloroethane, and chromium. The site has finished environmental remediation, and the last five-year review for the site was completed in August 2013. According to the EPA the site has been delisted from the national priority list.

Accidents and incidents
 On September 24, 1961, a USAF Fairchild C-123 Provider with 15 occupants aboard, including six skydivers, stalled and crashed after takeoff during an air show. There were three fatalities. 
 On August 22, 1962, a Piedmont Airlines Martin 4-0-4 swerved off the runway at ILM during a training flight. All three occupants survived but the aircraft was written off.
 On October 4, 1975, a twin-engine Cessna 310 (N29560) piloted by 28-year-old Vietnam War veteran Joseph Michael Farkas and arriving from Charlotte, crashed short of the field after running out of fuel.  The flight was carrying professional wrestling figures associated with Jim Crockett Promotions who were enroute to a card at Legion Stadium: promoter David Crockett and wrestlers Bobby Bruggers, Ric Flair, Johnny Valentine (then U.S. heavyweight champion, the promotion's top singles championship) and Tim Woods.  While Farkas died after spending two months in a coma at New Hanover County Hospital, all of his passengers survived with various injuries.
 On April 23, 1987, a Swearingen Metro II operating a cargo flight for Air-Lift Commuter suffered an engine failure on takeoff at ILM and crashed, killing both occupants.
 On May 4, 1990, a GAF Nomad arriving from Raleigh-Durham crashed on approach to runway 34, killing both occupants.

Airlines and destinations

Passenger

Cargo

Statistics

Top destinations

Other operations
As of January 31, 2022, 107 aircraft were based at the airport. There was 67 single engine aircraft, 11 multi-engine aircraft, 21 jet engine aircraft, and 8 helicopters.

For the year ending January 31, 2022, the airport had 78,237 operations, an average of 214 per day: 14% air carrier, 14% air taxi, 55% general aviation, and 17% military.

Charter services include Air Wilmington, which has its own dedicated building. There are also several private and public hangars. A new international customs station was completed in 2008.

As of June 13, 2022, there are two Fixed Base Operators providing handling services to business aviation.

Recent and future improvements

Wilmington International Airport is undergoing many improvements and additions to attract more business and to improve passengers' travel experience. The airport has built a new terminal to be used by United States Customs and Border Protection to process passengers from international flights. It has also built a new Visual Approach Slope Indicator ILS for Runway 24. The airport has recently upgraded its outdated ventilation system with a new, more efficient system in the main terminal.

In 2006, the FAA Airport Improvement Program awarded Wilmington International Airport $10,526,342. $3 million was allocated to improve runway safety areas, and $7,526,342 was allocated to expand the airport's apron area, rehabilitate Runway 6/24, and rehabilitate Taxiways B, C, and E. Runway 6/24 had not been rehabilitated in more than 30 years. Rehabilitation of Runway 17/35 was completed in 2014, and the project was honored with the Ray Brown Airport Pavement Award, which recognizes the highest-quality U.S. airfield pavement produced each year.

With passenger numbers continuing to grow rapidly, the airport began an $86 million terminal expansion project in 2018. The project is divided into three phases. Phase 1 reconstructed the TSA and DHS baggage screening facilities, and was largely unseen by passengers. Phase 1 began construction in the summer of 2018, and finished construction in April 2019. Phase 2 planned to expand the ticketing areas and airport offices. Construction for Phase 2 began in April 2019 and was expected to be complete in the summer of 2020. Phase 3 will involve renovating and expanding the concourse and TSA checkpoint to include more gates and screening lanes. Phase 3 was scheduled to begin in the fall of 2020 and to be complete in early 2022.

Governance

Wilmington International Airport is owned by New Hanover County. In 1987, the county created the New Hanover County Airport Authority to assist the airport director in running the airport. The airport is leased to the Airport Authority from New Hanover County for $1 per year until 2019.

The current Airport Director is Julie Wilsey, AAE, and the Deputy Director is Gary Broughton, CM. The New Hanover County Airport Authority has seven board members.

See also

 North Carolina World War II Army Airfields

References

External links
 FlyILM
  at North Carolina DOT airport guide
 
 
 

Airports in North Carolina
Buildings and structures in Wilmington, North Carolina
Transportation in New Hanover County, North Carolina
Airfields of the United States Army Air Forces in North Carolina
Superfund sites in North Carolina
Airports established in 1927
1927 establishments in North Carolina